The river Lézarde is one of the rivers that flow from the plateau of the southern Pays de Caux in the Seine-Maritime département of Normandy  into the Seine. 
The river rises at Saint-Martin-du-Bec and passes Notre-Dame-du-Bec, Rolleville, Épouville, Montivilliers  and joins the Seine at Harfleur.

Economy 
In the past, the river was host to many watermills that powered machinery to process both wheat and oil.

See also 
French water management scheme

References 

Rivers of France
Rivers of Normandy
Rivers of Seine-Maritime